Vaux d'Amognes is a commune in the department of Nièvre, central France. The municipality was established on 1 January 2017 by the merger of the former communes of Ourouër (the seat) and Balleray.

See also 
Communes of the Nièvre department

References 

Communes of Nièvre
Populated places established in 2017
2017 establishments in France